Karmaveera is a major Kannada weekly family interest magazine, published in Karnataka, India, which has its headquarters in Bengaluru, Karnataka. It is also published from Hubli, Davangere, Gulbarga and Mangaluru districts of Karnataka.

History 
Karmaveera was first published in 1921. Ranganath Ramchandra Diwakar, an ex-president of the KPCC, established the ′Loka Shikshana Trust′ (meaning: World Education Trust) on 27 April 1933, which publishes Kasthuri and Karmaveera.

Kannada writer and poet, P.V. Acharya, was one among the many editors of Karmaveera. Its current Editor is G. Anil Kumar.

See also
 List of Kannada-language magazines
 Media in Karnataka
 Media of India

References

Weekly magazines published in India
Film magazines published in India
Kannada-language magazines
Mass media in Bangalore
Magazines established in 1921